Tukuche, sometimes spelt Tukche,  is a village development committee in Mustang District in the Dhawalagiri Zone of northern Nepal. At the time of the 1991 Nepal census it had a population of 652 people living in 166 individual households.

The village is located in the Kali Gandaki Gorge.  It is a center of the Thakali people. These residing Thakali people brand the Thakali tradition, especially Thakali food items (Thakali Khana Set and Thakali Khaja Set), which is more trivial all around Nepal. Besides food, other attractions lie in the white plastered, wooden houses, dusty and dry land, and also the unique culture and lifestyle of people.

Sights
There are a number of sights of interest in Tukuche:
 Qpar Gompa
 Rani Gompa
 Sambha Gompa
 Tukuche Distillery
 Thakali Cultural Museum
 Thak library

References

External links
UN map of the municipalities of Mustang District

Populated places in Mustang District